Festival Of Colours is a concert like event with music and coloured powder. It takes place on 4 different continents. The event usually takes place on a Saturday from 12 noon to 10 pm.

History

Origins

The Festival Of Colours is inspired by the traditional Hindu festival Holi, which usually takes place in March an marks the coming of spring. On this day, people throw powdered paint, known as gulal (hindi) or rang (nepali), at each other. For one day the distinctions between castes, religions and gender are set aside and everyone is equal. The festival is primarily observed in India and Nepal, but also in many other countries with a large Hindu population.

Beginnings
It first came to Europe on 29 June 2012. The first Festival was held in Berlin on the grounds of the Postbahnhof. Some of the 'guests' complained about incorrect information from the organizer. It was not sold out despite free tickets being given away. Not much of the Holi symbolism was felt at the Berlin Holi Festival.

Growth
There were three more Festivals Of Colour in 2012 in Munich, Hannover and Dresden. Munich was the biggest with 10,000 guests. In 2013 the Festival Of Colours Tour went global, starting in Berlin on 10 May  and hitting 3 continents and 7 different countries. The focus of the 2013 tour was Germany with 14 cities and 15 events (Berlin had two events in 2013). However, there were events in many big Cities, like Vienna, Amsterdam, Barcelona, London, Mexico City and Cape Town. Overall the total number of events in 2013 was 25. 2013 was also the first time that the Festival Of Colours was held on two consecutive days. London hosted a total of nearly 30,000 people at the Battersea Power Station on 10 and 11 August. The biggest single-day festival took place in Mannheim with 20,000 guests. 2014 the expansion is set to continue with new countries and cities joining the list, including Italy (Rome), France (Paris), New Zealand (Auckland), Ireland (Dublin), Tunisia (Hammamet) and Switzerland (Zurich).

How it works

Procedure
The procedure is very similar in all the cities of the Festival Of Colours tour. The festival begins at 12 noon. The first guests arrive and a local warm-up DJs have the chance to show their stuff. Each of the acts plays for 1–2 hours, with occasional guest showcases who are on shorter. At 3 pm everyone comes together for the first simultaneous colour throw of the day. This is then repeated every hour until the end. At 10pm the event is over and the music stops. The festival usually takes place on a Saturday, with the exception last year of London, where there was an event on a Sunday as well to accommodate the enormous demand for tickets. A video is produced for each event  and onsite photo team follows each event, publishing pictures on the respective Facebook pages.

Set Up
Generally there is one large stages where the DJs perform. There are also showacts, such as Indian dancers, drummers and Performers. Of course food and drinks are essential for a daytime festival. There are numerous food and drink stalls spread over the festival grounds. There is a large variety, from Curry over Pizza and Pasta to French fries and icecream. The colour powder can be bought at the festival as well, along with various merchandise products, like t-shirts, masks, sunglasses or Indian decorations.

List of cities and countries
Source:

 
Buenos Aires
Mendoza
Cordoba

 
Vienna
Linz
 
Antwerp
 
Rio de Janeiro

 
Santiago de Chile

 
Santo Domingo

 
Paris

 
Berlin
Bochum
Cologne
Dortmund
Dresden
Essen
Frankfurt
Hamburg
Hannover
Karlsruhe
Leipzig
Leverkusen
Mannheim
Munich
Nuremberg
Oberhausen
Saarbrücken
Stuttgart
 
Athens
 
Rome
 
Dublin
 
Mexico City
Cancun
 
Amsterdam
Utrecht
 
Auckland

 
Lima

 
Cape Town
Johannesburg
Durban
 
Barcelona
Avilés
 
Zurich
 
London

Performing DJs

 Aka Aka
 Andhim
 Animal Swing Kids
 Bara Bröst
 Benga
 Bombay Boogie Soundsystem
 Borgeous
 Breakage
 Christian Varela
 Cuebrick
 Daniel Steinberg
 Das Bo
 Dirty Doering
 Drauf & Dran
 Drunken Masters
 Dumme Jungs

 Edu Imbernon
 Eskei83
 Feadz
 Hanne & Lore
 Hausdoktoren
 Honka
 Juan Sanchez
 Kabale und Liebe
 Kele (Bloc Party)
 Lexy & K-Paul
 Marc Marzenit
 Marcus Meinhardt
 Mightyfools
 MistaJam
 Modek

 Moguai
 Moonbootica
 Oliver Koletzki
 Ostblockschlampen
 Panjabi MC
 Sander Kleinenberg
 Sascha Braemer
 Schluck den Druck
 Stereo Express
 Steve Nash
 Superflu
 The Oddword
 Tiefschwarz
 Turntablerocker
 Umami

References

Music festivals in Europe
Music festivals established in 2012
Holi